Francis Neil Dawson  (born 6 November 1948) is a New Zealand sculptor, best known for his large-scale civic pieces crafted from aluminium and stainless steel, often made using a lattice of natural forms which between them form a geometric whole.

Early life
Dawson was born in Christchurch in 1948. The son of Methodist minister John Brent Dawson and his wife Florence Emily , he grew up in Masterton, Petone, and Hastings, and received his secondary education at Hastings Boys' High School where he was taught by Russ Williams.

While in the fourth form, Dawson climbed onto the assembly hall and painted April Fool in large white letters on the roof. This gave him front page exposure in the Hawke's Bay Herald-Tribune and he regards this as the "beginning of [his] career in public art."

Dawson attended the University of Canterbury (1966–1969) where he studied under  Tom Taylor and Eric Doudney. He gained a Diploma of Fine Arts (Hons) and then spent a year at teachers' college. This was followed, with the help of a Queen Elizabeth II Arts Council grant, by a Graduate Diploma in Sculpture from the Victorian College of the Arts, Melbourne, in 1973. On his return, Dawson drove a truck for four years, and taught drawing and design at Christchurch Polytechnic from 1975 to 1983.

Professional life
Dawson's best-known pieces include The Chalice, a large inverted cone in Cathedral Square, Christchurch, and Ferns, a sphere created from metal fern leaves which hangs above Wellington's Civic Square. Major overseas commissions include Globe, for the Pompidou Centre in Paris, and Canopy, for Brisbane's Queensland Art Gallery.

Dawson's smaller works often use illusion and such optical patterns as moiré to achieve their effects. Many of these works are wall-hangings, though stand-alone pieces using such everyday patterned items as the forms of playing cards and willow pattern crockery are also among Dawson's works.

Since the late 1980s, Dawson has worked as a full-time sculptor out of the former Oddfellows' Hall in Linwood.

Dr Michael Dunn, Emeritus Professor at the University of Auckland and a former head of Elam School of Fine Arts, describes Dawson in his book New Zealand Sculpture : A History as follows:

Dawson's sculpture is individual, unique and easy to recognise. In fact his sculptures flout convention in their lightness of feel, their transparency and their escape from the conventions of earthbound pedestal-based display.

Dunn's book has a photo of Ferns on its front cover dust-jacket.

Dawson's sculpture Fanfare was first suspended from the Sydney Harbour Bridge to welcome the 2005 year. The sculpture is made up of 350 reflective pinwheels arranged in a sphere. Sydney's Lord Mayor, Clover Moore, subsequently presented the sculpture to the Christchurch City Council as a gift. After a long time in storage, it was eventually decided to install Fanfare next to State Highway 1, just south of the Waimakariri River Bridge to welcome visitors coming to the city from the north. Fanfare was officially unveiled on 10 June 2015 by mayor Lianne Dalziel and Dawson. Dalziel, with reference to Fanfare's first installation in Sydney and to the destructive Christchurch earthquakes, said at the ceremony:

today feels like it's come home and it's really going to be a big statement about what our city is and what it's going to become

Dawson was more humble and described his artwork as "basically just a ball with some propellers on it".

In February 2014, Dawson's Spires was installed in Christchurch's Latimer Square. The work was inspired by Dawson's attempts to draw from memory the demolished spire of ChristChurch Cathedral. It was initially planned that the sculpture would hover over the centre of Latimer Square, along the axis of Worcester Street, so that a visual connection with ChristChurch Cathedral would be achieved. However, its current placement is in the southern half of Latimer Square, not far from the Cardboard Cathedral. A structural engineer had approached Dawson in 2012 to enquire whether he wanted to design another sculpture for Christchurch, and when he agreed, she donated her time to undertake the structural design for the installation.

Honours and awards
In 1990, Dawson was awarded the New Zealand 1990 Commemoration Medal. He received the Arts Foundation of New Zealand Arts Laureate Award in 2003, and in the 2004 New Year Honours he was appointed a Companion of the New Zealand Order of Merit, for services to sculpture.

Notes

References

External links

Neil Dawson in the collection of the Museum of New Zealand Te Papa Tongarewa
Ferns: a guide to the Wellington Civic Square sculpture
Milford galleries Neil Dawson page
Art News NZ article on Dawson
University of Canterbury Arts Trail Neil Dawson page
Art New Zealand article on Dawson

1948 births
Living people
Artists from Christchurch
People educated at Hastings Boys' High School
20th-century New Zealand sculptors
20th-century New Zealand male artists
21st-century New Zealand sculptors
21st-century male artists
People associated with the Canterbury Society of Arts
Companions of the New Zealand Order of Merit